Bangladesh Development Bank is a state-owned specialised commercial bank in Bangladesh. The bank has one of the highest loan default rates in Bangladesh. Shamima Nargis is the chairperson of the bank. Kazi Alamgir is the chief executive officer and managing director of the bank.

History 
Bangladesh Development Bank was established on 16 November 2009 as a Public Limited Company by merging the state-owned Bangladesh Shilpa Bank with the Bangladesh Shilpa Rin Sangstha; both were established on 31 October 1972. Bangladesh Development Bank started in 2010 with 534 court cases concerning 21 billion taka and 24.6 billion taka in written off liabilities.

Santi Narayan Ghosh was appointed chairperson of the Bangladesh Development Bank in September 2012.

In 2016,  former managing director of Karmasangsthan Bank, Mushtaque Ahmed, and  former deputy managing director of Rupali Bank Limited, Md Abu Hanif Khan, were appointed directors of Bangladesh Development Bank.

The bank has had issues with loan defaulting, as of 2018, the total defaulted loans at the bank stood at 23.32 billion taka. On 11 June 2019, the Anti-Corruption Commission sued for officials of the bank for allegedly embezzling 250 million taka from the bank. The commission arrested the former general manager of the bank, Syed Nurur Rahman Kadri, from Dhaka in November 2019. Other officials accused by commission were Dewan Mohammad Ishak, Assistant General Manager, and Dinesh Chandra Saha, principal officer, in the embezzlement case by Dhaka Trading and its owner Tipu Sultan .

On 28 November 2019, Kazi Alamgir, former managing director of Rajshahi Krishi Unnayan Bank, was appointed managing director of Bangladesh Development Bank. On 26 February 2019, Mohammad Mejbahuddin was appointed chairperson of the bank. The headquarters of the bank caught fire in October 2020. AHM Mustafa Kamal, Minister of Finance, considered merging Bangladesh Development Bank and BASIC Bank in 2021. In November 2021, Shamima Nargis was appointed chairperson of the bank.

In 2022, Bangladesh Development Bank signed an agreement with Bank Asia to work with Western Union for remittance. It is part of a consortium of six banks financing the Bashundhara Gold Refinery of Bashundhara Group.

Board of directors

References

Banks of Bangladesh
Banks established in 2009
National development banks